Pakotal (also Romanized as Pāḵotal; also known as Pāḵotalī) is a village in Garmkhan Rural District, Garmkhan District, Bojnord County, North Khorasan Province, Iran. At the 2006 census, its population was 304, in 79 families.

References 

Populated places in Bojnord County